Cambarus pristinus, the pristine crayfish, is a species of crayfish in the family Cambaridae. It is endemic to Tennessee.

References

Further reading

 
 
 

Cambaridae
Articles created by Qbugbot
Crustaceans described in 1965
Freshwater crustaceans of North America
Taxa named by Horton H. Hobbs Jr.
Endemic fauna of Tennessee